WEZJ-FM (104.3 FM) is a radio station  broadcasting a country music format. Licensed to Williamsburg, Kentucky, United States, the station is currently owned by Whitley Broadcasting Co., Inc. and features news from Fox News Radio and programming from ABC Radio.  The station is the flagship radio affiliate for University of the Cumberlands Patriots and Whitley County Colonels high school athletics and is also an affiliate of the UK IMG Sports Network (University of Kentucky Wildcats athletics).

References

External links

EZJ-FM